Until 1 January 2007 Nykøbing-Rørvig municipality was a municipality (Danish, kommune) in the former West Zealand County on the northwest coast of the island of Zealand (Sjælland) in Denmark, at the mouth of the Isefjord.  The municipality covered an area of 40 km², and had a total population of 7,610 (2005).  Its last mayor was Vagn Ytte Larsen, a member of the Social Democrats (Socialdemokraterne) political party. The site of its municipal council is the town of Nykøbing Sjælland.

To the northwest of the former municipality is Nyrup Bay (Nyrup Bugt) and Hesselø Bay (Hesselø Bugt), to the east is the Isefjord, and to the southeast is Nykøbing Bay (Nykøbing Bugt).

Nykøbing-Rørvig  municipality ceased to exist, as the result of  Kommunalreformen ("The Municipality Reform" of 2007).  It was merged with existing Dragsholm and Trundholm municipalities to form the new Odsherred municipality.  This create a municipality with an area of 355 km² and a total population of 32,739 (2005).  The new municipality belongs to Region Sjælland ("Zealand Region").

External links
 The new Odsherred municipality's official website (Danish only)
 Odsherred's tourist bureau

References 
 Municipal statistics: NetBorger Kommunefakta, delivered from KMD aka Kommunedata (Municipal Data)
 Municipal mergers and neighbors: Eniro new municipalities map

Former municipalities of Denmark